Frank M. Sontag is an American radio personality having hosted programs for over a couple decades. In 2009, he began hosting an internet talk radio show. Sontag was a regular cast member on the Mark & Brian radio program. He also has had small acting parts in a few motion pictures.

Radio Host

FM 95.5 KLOS, Impact 

Sontag hosted the Impact program on 95.5 KLOS-FM for more than twenty years, a talk radio show that discussed a wide variety of topics.

FM 99.5 KKLA, the Frank Sontag show 

KKLA is a Christian talk and teaching radio station based in Los Angeles, California, first aired in 1985.

In 2013, Sontag joined KKLA-FM 99.5 FM on the program The Frank Sontag show: Intersection of Faith and Reason, a Christian talk and discussion forum. He succeeded Frank Pastore of The Frank Pastore Show following Pastore's death in 2012.

Sontag announced his departure from KKLA with a final episode posted on July 28, 2021.

Personal

On March 7, 2010, a few months after leaving KLOS Radio, Sontag expressed a conversion to Christianity This affected his radio programming choices.

As of 2004, Sontag was married to Erin with one daughter and one son.

Book 

Sontag's book is autobiographical, Light the Way Home: My Incredible Ride from New Age to New Life.

References

External links

American talk radio hosts
Radio personalities from Cleveland
1955 births
Living people